Robert Eugene Durnbaugh (born January 15, 1933) is a former Major League Baseball player.

Early life
Bobby Durnbaugh was born on January 15, 1933, in Dayton, Ohio. He attended Beavercreek High School in nearby Beavercreek, Ohio.

References

External links

Venezuelan Professional Baseball League

Living people
1933 births
Baseball players from Dayton, Ohio
Cincinnati Redlegs players
Industriales de Valencia players
Major League Baseball shortstops
Mobile Bears players
Nashville Vols players
Ogden Reds players
Omaha Cardinals players
Rochester Red Wings players
Seattle Rainiers players
Shreveport Sports players
Welch Miners players